The Gloomy Day is an oil on wood painting by Pieter Bruegel in 1565. The painting is one in a series of six works, five of which are still extant, that depict different times of the year. The painting is currently in the collection of the Kunsthistorisches Museum, located in Vienna, Austria.

The scene is set around February and March, portrayed by the bleak atmosphere and leafless trees. The paper crown around the boy's head and the eating of waffles are references to the Carnival time prior to Lent. The sky, the ships crashing against the shoreline, and the children preparing themselves in the foreground suggest that harsh weather is coming.

Bruegel is famous for his paintings of scenery and nature.  Most of his paintings of the countryside tell a story or have a moral message.

The surviving Months of the Year cycle are:

References

External links
 
 

1565 paintings
Paintings by Pieter Bruegel the Elder
Paintings in the collection of the Kunsthistorisches Museum
Maritime paintings